The Henry G. Shirley Memorial Highway, often shortened to Shirley Highway, consists of a  portion of Interstates 95 and 395 in the U.S. Commonwealth of Virginia. Shirley Highway was the first limited-access freeway in Virginia. Begun in 1941, the road was completed from U.S. Route 1 in Colchester, Virginia, just north of Woodbridge, to the 14th Street Bridge over the Potomac River between Virginia and Washington, D.C. in 1952.

History 
The Shirley Highway is named in honor of Henry G. Shirley, the head of the Virginia Department of Highways (now Virginia Department of Transportation) from 1922 to 1941, who died in July, 1941, just a few weeks after giving the "go-ahead" for work on the new highway. The road was originally a four-lane highway, and it was designated State Route 350 from its southern intersection with U.S. Route 1 north of the Occoquan River near Woodbridge, Virginia, and its northern intersection with U.S. Route 1 near the Pentagon in Arlington, Virginia.

Construction began in October 1941. The first section in Arlington, from the Pentagon south to State Route 7, mostly 2 lanes, was opened in October 1943. This section was completed with four lanes in October 1944. Due to wartime constraints, the new highway had an unusual at-grade railroad crossing instead of a bridge over the Washington and Old Dominion Railroad just north of Shirlington Circle. This location was the site of a fatal collision between a train and a dump truck on June 26, 1952. The remaining portions of the Shirley Highway south to U.S. Route 1 in Colchester, just north of Woodbridge, were completed in 1952. It facilitated the rapid development of Arlington County in the Shirlington, Parkfairfax, and Fairlington neighborhoods during World War II, and during that period connected the city to suburban shopping opportunities at Shirlington Shopping Center, at that time a five-minute trip away.

The original "Mixing Bowl": largest in the world 

The new Shirley Highway included the "Mixing Bowl" interchange complex near the newly completed Pentagon (War Department Building), which was completed in 1944. At this location, the State Route 27 freeway (Washington Blvd.) merges with the Shirley Highway and then branches off again. The original interchange had a merge section each way, about 1/3 mile long, with a third "mixing lane" where the vehicles would weave when they wanted to change to the other freeway. It was rebuilt in the 1960s. After rebuilding, it was the largest interchange complex in the world. There are currently 52 lane-miles of roadways and ramps, with four freeway junctions and numerous local ramps, and with several interchanges to the reversible express (HOV) roadway, all within a  section of the Shirley Highway.

I-95, I-395 

From 1965 to 1975, the Shirley Highway was reconstructed to Interstate Highway System standards. As portions were completed, they were designated as Interstate 95. Original plans called for I-95 to cut straight through Washington, D.C., and connect with the Capital Beltway (I-495) in Maryland. However, community opposition halted this plan in 1977, diverting planned funding to construction of the Washington Metro subway system.

Because of the cancellation of the originally-proposed section of I-95 from New York Avenue in the District of Columbia, northward into Prince George's County to Interstate 495, the Capital Beltway, the I-95 designation was rerouted onto the eastern half of the Beltway. The remaining portion of the Shirley Highway north of Springfield was redesignated Interstate 395, which continues into D.C. to its end at U.S. Route 50 (New York Avenue).

Shirley Busway
On September 22, 1969, the reversible roadway between Edsall Road and SR 7 was converted to the first separated bus rapid transit (BRT) route on an Interstate highway during peak morning commute hours (0630–0930); this was extended north to Shirlington the next day. The busway was extended to north of Glebe Road in September 1970, and then to the new Center Span Bridge on April 5, 1971. The Shirley Highway Express Bus-on-Freeway Project was implemented from June 1971 to the end of 1974, demonstrating that BRT on a highway was a feasible way to boost public transit ridership and on-time performance. However, compared to the Lindenwold High Speed Line, a light rail service of comparable distance serving approximately the same number of people, Prof. Vukan R. Vuchic found the Shirley Busway had fewer riders and revenue.

Springfield Interchange

The roots of the Springfield Interchange began with the Shirley Highway. This jumble of highways in Springfield, Virginia, where I-395, I-95, and the Capital Beltway meet, is officially called the "Springfield Interchange." It is colloquially referred to as the "Mixing Bowl," but highway officials still use that terminology to refer to the interchange complex at the Pentagon (see Pentagon road network).

Exit list

References

External links

Kurumi Roads website
Roads to the Future website
Virginia Department of Transportation (VDOT) website

Monuments and memorials in Virginia
Historic American Engineering Record in Virginia
Interstate 95
Freeways in the United States